Tracheobronchomegaly is a very rare congenital disorder of the lung primarily characterized by an abnormal widening of the upper airways.  The abnormally widened trachea and mainstem bronchi are associated with recurrent lower respiratory tract infection and copious purulent sputum production, eventually leading to bronchiectasis and other respiratory complications.

Diagnosis
Woodring et al. (1991) suggested the following diagnostic criteria for tracheomegaly in adults based on chest radiography:
 Adult Males: Tracheal transverse diameter > 25 mm and sagittal diameter > 27 mm.
 Adult Females: Tracheal transverse diameter > 21 mm and sagittal diameter > 23 mm.

History
The term "Mounier-Kuhn syndrome" derives from the characterization of the condition by Prof. Pierre-Louis Mounier-Kuhn in 1932, while the name "tracheobronchomegaly" was introduced by Katz et al. in 1962.

References

External links 

Congenital disorders of respiratory system
Rare diseases
Syndromes
Trachea
Bronchus disorders